Emmanuel Zapata (born 7 October 1986) is an Argentine modern pentathlete. He competed at the 2016 Summer Olympics in Rio de Janeiro, in the men's event.

References

1986 births
Living people
Argentine male modern pentathletes
Olympic modern pentathletes of Argentina
Modern pentathletes at the 2016 Summer Olympics
South American Games silver medalists for Argentina
South American Games medalists in modern pentathlon
Competitors at the 2018 South American Games
Modern pentathletes at the 2007 Pan American Games
Modern pentathletes at the 2011 Pan American Games
Modern pentathletes at the 2015 Pan American Games
Modern pentathletes at the 2019 Pan American Games
Pan American Games medalists in modern pentathlon
Pan American Games bronze medalists for Argentina
Medalists at the 2019 Pan American Games
20th-century Argentine people
21st-century Argentine people